Marquis  was a daimyō of Hiroshima Domain for a short time after the Meiji Restoration.  For the rest of the Meiji period, he was a politician and diplomat, and was one of the last surviving Japanese daimyō (Hayashi Tadataka and Wakebe Mitsunori outlived him).

Biography
Adopted by his uncle Asano Nagamichi, he served as assistant to his adoptive father through the 1860s, and attended many of the meetings and events surrounding the restoration of Imperial rule, and as such was one of many who advised the shōgun Tokugawa Yoshinobu to return power to the Emperor of Japan. Unlike many from domains such as Satsuma and Chōshū, however, Asano was opposed to taking military action against the shogunate. His childhood name was Kiyotsuchi (喜代槌) later Tamegoro (為五郎).

Nagakoto became the twelfth daimyō of Hiroshima in 1869 upon Nagamichi's retirement. The domains (han) were abolished in 1871, but Asano was granted the title of Marquis (kōshaku) under the kazoku system of peerage which was instituted at that time.

He became a member of the Genrōin (Chamber of Elders) in 1880, was appointed ambassador to Italy two years later, and served in the House of Peers for a time as well. Though living and serving in Tokyo, he worked to support industry and other enterprises in his home area, newly dubbed Hiroshima Prefecture.

The Asano Library (now the Hiroshima Central City Library) opened in 1926, and Asano died in 1937 at the age of 96.

Family
 Father: Asano Tsutomo
 Mother: daughter of Sawa Yoshimoto
 Adoptive Father: Asano Nagamichi
 Wife: Yamanouchi Tsunahime, daughter of Yamanouchi Toyoteru, 13th Daimyo of Tosa Domain
 Adopted Children:
 Asano Nagamichi
 Asano Nagaatsu (1843–1873)
 Mashiko married Matsura Atsushi
 Asano Nagayuki, his cousin (son of his uncle Asano Toshitsugu)

References 
 Much of this article is derived from a translation of the corresponding article on the Japanese Wikipedia.
 Frederic, Louis (2002). Japan Encyclopedia. Cambridge, Massachusetts: Harvard University Press.

Daimyo
Kazoku
Members of the House of Peers (Japan)
1842 births
1937 deaths
Asano clan
Ambassadors of Japan to Italy
People from Hiroshima
People from Hiroshima Prefecture
Politicians from Hiroshima Prefecture